Mayor of Punkville is a double live album by American jazz bassist William Parker and his Little Huey Creative Music Orchestra, which was recorded at Tonic in New York City in 1999 and released on the AUM Fidelity label.

Reception

In her review for AllMusic, Jocelyn Layne states "It is a terrific proof of bassist William Parker's strength as a leader and is one of his most engaging releases to date". The All About Jazz review noted "Parker's vision on Mayor of Punkville realizes itself over time through a living, breathing apparatus of free improvisation".

Track listing
All compositions by William Parker

Disc One:  
 " Interlude #1 (The Next Phase)" - 4:00
 "James Baldwin to the Rescue" - 18:26
 "Oglala Eclipse" - 19:47
 "I Can't Believe I Am Here" - 28:50   
Disc Two: 
 "Interlude #7 (Huey's Blues)" - 5:23
 "3 Steps to Noh Mountain: Departure" - 5:08    
 "3 Steps to Noh Mountain: Soft Wheel" - 5:22    
 "3 Steps to Noh Mountain: Laughing Eyes and Dancing" - 3:45    
 "The Mayor of Punkville" - 30:51
 "Interlude #8 (Holy Door)" - 6:01
 "Anthem" - 13:07  
Recorded at Tonic in NYC on July 10 (Disc One, tracks 2 & 3), August 14 (Disc Two, tracks 2-4), September 4 (Disc One, track 4 & Disc Two tracks 5 & 7) & November 27 (Disc One, track 1 & Disc Two, tracks 1 & 6)

Personnel
William Parker - bass, piano
Roy Campbell Jr. - trumpet - flugelhorn
Lewis Barnes, Richard Rodriguez - trumpet 
Masahiko Kono, Alex Lodico, Steve Swell - trombone 
Darryl Foster - tenor saxophone, soprano saxophone
Chris Jonas - soprano saxophone 
Rob Brown - alto saxophone, flute 
Ori Kaplan - alto saxophone
Charles Waters - alto saxophone, clarinet
Dave Sewelson - baritone saxophone
Dave Hofstra - tuba, bass 
Andrew Barker - drums 
Cooper-Moore - piano (Disc One, tracks 2 & 3) 
Aleta Hayes - voice (Disc One, track 2)

References

2000 live albums
AUM Fidelity live albums
William Parker (musician) live albums